Shatabdi (English: The Century) (Bengali: শতাব্দী) is a Bengali word. It may refer to :

People 
Shatabdi Roy, Indian Bengali actress
Shatabdi Wadud, Bangladeshi actor

Trains 
Shatabdi Express, a series of Express trains, operated by Indian Railways
Jan Shatabdi Express, a series of Express trains, operated by Indian Railways
Habibganj – New Delhi Shatabdi Express, an express train of Shatabdi Express, operated by Indian Railways
Howrah – Puri Shatabdi Express, an express train of Shatabdi Express, operated by Indian Railways
Howrah Ranchi Shatabdi Express, an express train of Shatabdi Express, operated by Indian Railways
New Jalpaiguri Howrah Shatabdi Express, an express train of Shatabdi Express, operated by Indian Railways
Pune Secunderabad Shatabdi Express, an express train of Shatabdi Express, operated by Indian Railways
Chennai Central–Mysuru Shatabdi Express, an express train of Shatabdi Express, operated by Indian Railways